The 1908 United States presidential election in Illinois took place on November 3, 1908. All contemporary 46 states were part of the 1908 United States presidential election. State voters chose 27 electors to the Electoral College, which selected the president and vice president.

Illinois was won by the Republican nominees, former Secretary of War William Howard Taft of Ohio and his running mate James S. Sherman of New York.

Results

Results by county

See also
 United States presidential elections in Illinois

Notes

References

Illinois
1908
1908 Illinois elections